David L. Bretherton (February 29, 1924 – May 11, 2000) was an American film editor with more than 40 credits for films released from 1954 to 1996.

Bretherton, the son of editor/director Howard Bretherton and actress Dorothea McEvoy, was born in Los Angeles. He served with the United States Air Force during World War II. After World War II, he joined the editing department at Twentieth Century-Fox, at first helping other editors, including Barbara McLean, Robert L. Simpson, Louis R. Loeffler, James B. Clark, William H. Reynolds, and, in later years, Dorothy Spencer and Hugh S. Fowler. His first project as a film editor was An Affair to Remember in 1954.  In 1995, Bretherton received the American Cinema Editors Career Achievement Award. Bretherton died of pneumonia in Los Angeles in 2000.

Bretherton's most noted work was the editing of the film Cabaret (1972), which was directed by Bob Fosse. Bretherton received the Academy Award for Best Film Editing, an ACE Eddie Award, and a nomination for the BAFTA Award for Best Editing for this film. In his 1972 review, Roger Greenspun gives some insight into Bretherton's achievement:

Cabaret was listed as the 30th best-edited film of all time in a 2012 survey of members of the Motion Picture Editors Guild.

Filmography

References

External links

David Bretherton at TheOscarSite.com

American film editors
Best Film Editing Academy Award winners
Film people from Los Angeles
1924 births
2000 deaths
Deaths from pneumonia in California